Madfinger Games is a Czech publisher and developer of video games headquartered in Brno. Known as the authors of a series of games Dead Trigger, Samurai, Shadowgun and many others. The studio is made up of experienced developers who have worked on games such as Mafia: The City of Lost Heaven, Vietcong and Hidden & Dangerous 2.

History 
Before Madfinger Games was formed, its members worked at 2K Czech while also working at Madfinger Games. The company itself was founded in 2008, and the following year they began releasing their first games, including 15 Blocks Puzzle, the BloodyXmas arcade game, and the first game in the Samurai series, Samurai: Way of the Warrior for iOS mobile platforms.

With the appearance of their studio in 2010, they began to develop and release the sequels of Samurai: Way of the Warrior: Samurai II: Vengeance and Samurai II: Dojo, which at that time became the most popular games among iOS and Android users. In 2011, a new game Shadowgun was released, which became the first of the first-person shooters for developers, which was also warmly received by iOS and Android users, later the game was released for Amazon Kindle, BlackBerry, GameStick and OUYA. In December of the same year, a small plot add-on Shadowgun The Leftover was released for the game.

A year has passed since the debut of Shadowgun and the developers decided to continue releasing shooters, but now with elements of survival, this is how the first Dead Trigger appeared, released on June 26, 2012, for iOS and Android, and a year later appeared Dead Trigger 2, which expanded all the facets of the new series. Nobody forgot about Shadowgun either, and in the same 2012, the Shadowgun Deadzone multiplayer project was released, which became a spin-off to the original Shadowgun, and, in addition to iOS and Android, was released for PC, Facebook and macOS.

In 2015, due to the appearance of cheating on the main servers of the game, the PC and macOS versions were disabled, leaving only three platforms. At the end of December 2018, access to iOS was terminated, and in March 2019 for Android, and it was then that the developers announced the closure of the project from April 1, 2019, thanking and rewarding all players with 200 thousand gold (one of the in-game currencies).

On March 22, 2018, a new multiplayer project Shadowgun Legends was released, announced in August 2016, which is a continuation of the original Shadowgun and the spin-off Shadowgun Deadzone. Another Shadowgun War Games project has been announced for 2019. There is no further mention of the Dead Trigger series after the release of Dead Trigger 2.

Games 
 15 Blocks Puzzle – 2009
 Samurai: Way of the Warrior – 2009
 BloodyXmas – 2009
 Samurai II: Vengeance – 2010
 Shadowgun – 2011
 Dead Trigger – 2012
 Shadowgun: Deadzone – 2012
 Dead Trigger 2 – 2013
 Monzo – 2014
 Unkilled – 2015
 Shadowgun Legends – 2018
 Shadowgun War Games – 2020

References

External links 
 

Companies based in Brno
Czech companies established in 2008
Mobile game companies
Video game companies established in 2008
Video game companies of the Czech Republic
Video game development companies